Quincy Omar Monk (January 30, 1979 – November 24, 2015) was an American football linebacker in the National Football League for the New York Giants and the Houston Texans. He was drafted in the seventh round of the 2002 NFL Draft by the Giants. He played college football at North Carolina.

Early years
Monk was born in Jacksonville, North Carolina. He attended White Oak High School where he played quarterback, safety and defensive end. At White Oak, he also played basketball where as well as in football he was named All-conference and All-area in his junior and senior seasons.

Professional career

New York Giants
The New York Giants drafted Monk in the seventh round (246th overall) in the 2002 NFL Draft. He was one of six players from North Carolina taken, which was then the highest since seven were taken in 1998. Monk signed a three–year $930,500 contract with the Giants on June 24. During the Giants 2002 playoff loss to the San Francisco 49ers, Monk almost had his head "decapitated" when tight end Dan Campbell drop–kicked his helmet. Campbell later apologized for the incident. He recorded three tackles during his rookie season. In October, Monk and Giants teammates, Will Allen, Brian Mitchell, Marcellus Rivers, Kevin Lewis, Tim Carter, Delvin Joyce, Nick Greisen and Ataveus Cash participated in a cooking competition sponsored by the Giants. In 2003, Monk recorded four tackles for the Giants. He was released as a final cut before the 2004 season on September 5. Throughout his career with New York, Monk was inactivated in 19 games and played in 13.

Houston Texans
Monk signed with the Houston Texans on December 17, 2004 and played in two games for the team, recording two tackles. He was released on August 30, 2005.

NFL statistics

Post career
Monk was hired by Argentum Capital Management as a managing director. A few weeks later he was appointed to the University of North Carolina's Board of Visitors. He also held positions at Citigroup Smith Barney and Captrust following his playing days. He was employed as a senior recruiter at The Select Group in Raleigh, North Carolina.

Monk suffered a stroke in the summer of 2015 and while in for treatment, doctors discovered that he had cancer. He died on November 24, 2015 from cancer at the age of 36.

References

External links
North Carolina Tar Heels bio

1979 births
2015 deaths
People from Jacksonville, North Carolina
Players of American football from North Carolina
American football linebackers
North Carolina Tar Heels football players
New York Giants players
Houston Texans players
Deaths from cancer in North Carolina